Raymond Janin, A.A. (31 August 1882 – 12 July 1972) was a French Byzantinist. An Assumptionist priest, he was also the author of several significant works on Byzantine studies.

Major works
La Thrace: Études historique et géographique (1920)
Les Églises orientales et les rites orientaux (1922) 
Saint Basile, archevêque de Césarée et Docteur de l'Église (1929)
Les Églises séparées d'Orient (1930) 
Constantinople byzantine. Développement urbain et répertoire topographique (1950); 2nd revised edition 1964
La Géographie ecclésiastique de l'empire byzantine (1953)

References

Sources

1882 births
1972 deaths
French Byzantinists
French male non-fiction writers
20th-century French male writers